The 8th Goya Awards were presented in Madrid on 21 January 1994.

Todos a la cárcel (Everyone Off to Jail) won the award for best film.

Winners and nominees

Major award nominees

Other award nominees

Honorary Goya
 Tony Leblanc

References

External links
Official website (Spanish)

08
1993 film awards
1993 in Spanish cinema